Sackville School is a coeducational secondary school and sixth form located in East Grinstead, England. In 2020, the number of students was approximately 1670. Sackville is one of two state-funded secondary schools in the town, the other being Imberhorne School.

History
The school was founded in 1859 as a national church school. Originally on De la Warr Road, where Chequer Mead lies today, in 1951 the school was renamed Sackville and in 1964, it was moved to its current location on Lewes Road. 1970 saw the school's first comprehensive intake, following the rapidly growing local housing estate building developments. In 2004, Sackville's name was changed back from Sackville Community College to Sackville School. The school's emblem is the red rose of the Duchy of Lancaster of which East Grinstead was once a part.

The headteacher is Ms Jo Meloni. There are seven year groups, including a sixth form of two years. Each year group has a year tutor (Head of Year).

In 2019, the school was rated good by Ofsted.

Curriculum
The Key Stage 5 offer at Sackville includes:
 Art and Design
Biology
Physics
Chemistry
Business Studies
Computer Science
Drama and Theatre
Economics
English Language
English Literature
Film Studies
Geography
History
Law
Mathematics
Further Mathematics
Media Studies
French
German
Spanish
Music
Photography
Politics
Product Design
Psychology
Religious studies
Sociology
Sport and Physical Education
Textiles

Notable former pupils
 William Adkin (1990-), cricketer
 Gavin Collins (1966-), Church of England bishop
 Nicola Edgington (1980-), murderer.
 Laura van der Heijden (1997-), cellist
 Katherine Joy, Reader in Geology at the University of Manchester
 Jane Leeves (1972-), actress (played Daphne in Frasier)
 Drew Pearce (1975-), film and television writer and producer
 Lance Price (1958-), journalist and political commentator
 Rob Cross (1990-), professional darts player

References

External links
 Sackville's Website

Educational institutions established in 1859
East Grinstead
Community schools in West Sussex
1859 establishments in England
Secondary schools in West Sussex